Kévin Lalouette (born 18 February 1984 in Abbeville) is a French former professional road and track cyclist.

Major results

2005
 6th La Côte Picarde
2006
 6th Grand Prix de la ville de Nogent-sur-Oise
 9th Paris–Troyes
2008
 5th Grand Prix de la ville de Pérenchies
2009
 2nd Overall Mi-Août en Bretagne
 2nd Grand Prix des Marbriers
2010
 2nd Overall Mi-Août en Bretagne
 2nd Grand Prix des Marbriers
 7th Overall Ronde de l'Oise
2011
 2nd Overall Ronde de l'Oise
2014
 3rd Grand Prix des Marbriers
2016
 1st Circuit de Wallonie
 5th Grand Prix des Marbriers

References

External links

Sportspeople from Abbeville
1984 births
Living people
French male cyclists
Cyclists from Hauts-de-France